These are the squad listings of the women's national teams at the  2017 Central American Games.

Costa Rica
Head coach: Amelia Valverde

El Salvador
Head coach: José Ricardo Herrera

Nicaragua
Head coach: Elna Dixon

Panama

Head coach:  Víctor Suárez

References

Football at the 2017 Central American Games
Central
2017 women